Georg von Kopp (25 July 1837 – 4 March 1914) was a German Cardinal of the Roman Catholic Church who served as Bishop of Fulda (1881–87) and Prince-Bishop of Breslau (1887–1914). He was known for his anti-Polish views and pursued the Germanization of Polish Catholics in his dioceses.

Biography
Kopp was born in Duderstadt in the Kingdom of Hanover. He was the son of a weaver and attended the gymnasium at Hildesheim. In 1856 he became a telegraph operator in the employ of the Hanoverian government. From 1858 to 1861, he studied theology and in 1862 entered the priesthood. He rose rapidly in his profession and in 1872 was made vicar-general at Hildesheim and three years later bishop of Fulda. He worked to bring about a better understanding between the German government and the papal curia. After his election to the House of Lords he obtained a mitigation of the anti-Catholic provisions which characterized the May laws.

In 1887, with the approval of the Prussian government, the Pope appointed him prince-bishop of Breslau (Wroclaw), and in 1893 he was made cardinal. As prince bishop he pursued Germanization and censured those priests whom he suspected as resisting these measures, opposed used of Polish in classes and communion, and tried secretly to discourage Polish faithful from making pilgrimages to Krakow. He was made Cardinal by Pope Leo XIII in 1893. He took part in the 1903 conclave which elected Pope Pius X. He was honored to be listed first among the recipients of that pope’s encyclical Singulari Quadam promulgated on 24 September 1912. Kopp died in Opava in Austrian Silesia.

Notes

References

Salvador Miranda: The Cardinals of the Holy Roman Church

1837 births
1914 deaths
People from Duderstadt
People from the Kingdom of Hanover
20th-century German cardinals
Cardinals created by Pope Leo XIII
Roman Catholic bishops of Fulda
Prince-Bishops of Breslau
Members of the Diet of Austrian Silesia
Members of the Prussian House of Lords
19th-century German cardinals